Allotalanta oporista is a moth in the family Cosmopterigidae. It was described by Edward Meyrick in 1926. It is found in New Ireland.

References

Natural History Museum Lepidoptera generic names catalog

Moths described in 1926
Cosmopteriginae
Moths of New Guinea